Santarelli is an Italian surname. Notable people with the surname include:

Andrea Santarelli (born 1993), fencer

Daniele Santarelli (born 1981), volleyball coach
Emilio Santarelli, 19th-century Tuscan sculptor
Giuseppe Santarelli (1710–1790), composer and singer
Simone Santarelli, footballer

Italian-language surnames